The Comics Code Authority (CCA) was formed in 1954 by the Comics Magazine Association of America as an alternative to government regulation. The CCA allowed the comic publishers to self-regulate the content of comic books in the United States. The code was voluntary; there was no law requiring its use, although some advertisers and retailers looked to it for reassurance. Some publishers including Dell, Western, and Classics Illustrated never used it. Its code, commonly called "the Comics Code", lasted until the early 21st century. The CC formation followed a moral panic centered around a series of Senate hearings and the publication of psychiatrist Fredric Wertham's book Seduction of the Innocent.

Members submitted comics to the CCA, which screened them for adherence to its code, then authorized the use of their seal on the cover if the book was found to be in compliance. At the height of its influence, it was a de facto censor for the entire U.S. comic book industry.

By the early 2000s, publishers bypassed the CCA and Marvel Comics abandoned it in 2001. By 2010, only three major publishers still adhered to it: DC Comics, Archie Comics, and Bongo Comics. Bongo broke with the CCA in 2010. DC and Archie followed in January 2011, rendering the code completely defunct.

Founding 
The Comics Magazine Association of America (CMAA) was formed in September 1954 in response to a widespread public concern over graphic violence and horror imagery in comic books. It named New York magistrate Charles F. Murphy (1920–1992), a specialist in juvenile delinquency, to head the organization and devise a self-policing "code of ethics and standards" for the industry. He established the Comics Code Authority (CCA), basing its code upon the largely unenforced code drafted by the Association of Comics Magazine Publishers in 1948, which in turn had been modeled loosely after the 1940 Hollywood Production Code, also known as the "Hays Code".

Before the CCA was adopted, some cities already had organized public burnings and bans on comic books. The city councils of Oklahoma City, Oklahoma, and Houston, Texas, passed ordinances banning crime and horror comics, although an attempt by Los Angeles County, California, was deemed unconstitutional by the courts.

In his introduction to Archie Americana Series Best of the Fifties, editor Victor Gorelick reminisced about the code, writing, "My first assignment, as a new art assistant, was to remove cleavages and lift up low cut blouses on Katy Keene." He also wrote of Archie artist Harry Lucey that, "His sometimes suggestive storytelling – and he was one of the best – almost cost him his job.  When his pencilled stories came in, the characters were dressed on one page only. The inker, a woman by the name of Terry Szenics, would have to clothe them on the remaining pages."

Although the CCA had no official control over the comics publishers, most distributors refused to carry comics which did not carry the seal. However, two major publishers of comics – Dell Comics and Gold Key Comics – did not display the seal, because their output was subject to a higher authority: their licensors which included Walt Disney and the producers of many TV shows aimed at children.

Criticism and enforcement 
Some publishers thrived under these restrictions, while others adapted by cancelling titles and focusing on code-approved content; still others went out of business. In practice, the negative effect of not having CCA approval was lack of distribution by the comic book wholesalers, who, as one historian observed, "served as the enforcement arm of the Comics Code Authority by agreeing to handle only those comics with the seal."

Publisher William Gaines believed that clauses forbidding the words "crime", "horror", and "terror" in comic book titles had been deliberately aimed at his own best-selling titles Crime SuspenStories, The Vault of Horror, and Tales from the Crypt.

Wertham dismissed the code as an inadequate half-measure. Comics analyst Scott McCloud, on the other hand, later commented that it was as if, in drawing up the code, "the list of requirements a film needs to receive a G rating was doubled, and there were no other acceptable ratings!"

"Judgment Day" 
In one early confrontation between a comic-book publisher and the code authorities, EC Comics' William Gaines reprinted the story "Judgment Day", from the pre-code Weird Fantasy #18 (April 1953), in Incredible Science Fiction #33 (February 1956). The reprint was a replacement for the Code-rejected story "An Eye for an Eye", drawn by Angelo Torres, though "Judgment Day" was itself also objected to because of the central character being black. The story, by writer Al Feldstein and artist Joe Orlando, was an allegory against racial prejudice, a point which was necessarily nullified if the lead character was not black. Following an order by code administrator Judge Charles Murphy to change the final panel, which depicted a black astronaut, Gaines engaged in a heated dispute with Murphy. He threatened to inform the press of Murphy's objection to the story if they did not give the issue the Code Seal, causing Murphy to reverse his initial decision and allow the story to run. Soon after, however, facing the severe restrictions placed upon his comics by the CCA, and with his "New Direction" titles floundering, Gaines quit comic book publishing to concentrate on Mad.

1954 Code criteria 
The following shows the complete Code as it stood in 1954:
 Crimes shall never be presented in such a way as to create sympathy for the criminal, to promote distrust of the forces of law and justice, or to inspire others with a desire to imitate criminals.
 If crime is depicted it shall be as a sordid and unpleasant activity.
 Policemen, judges, government officials, and respected institutions shall never be presented in such a way as to create disrespect for established authority.
 Criminals shall not be presented so as to be rendered glamorous or to occupy a position which creates a desire for emulation.
 In every instance good shall triumph over evil and the criminal punished for his misdeeds.
 Scenes of excessive violence shall be prohibited. Scenes of brutal torture, excessive and unnecessary knife and gunplay, physical agony, the gory and gruesome crime shall be eliminated.
 No comic magazine shall use the words "horror" or "terror" in its title.
 All scenes of horror, excessive bloodshed, gory or gruesome crimes, depravity, lust, sadism, masochism shall not be permitted.
 All lurid, unsavory, gruesome illustrations shall be eliminated.
 Inclusion of stories dealing with evil shall be used or shall be published only where the intent is to illustrate a moral issue and in no case shall evil be presented alluringly, nor so as to injure the sensibilities of the reader.
 Scenes dealing with, or instruments associated with walking dead, torture, vampires and vampirism, ghouls, cannibalism, and werewolfism are prohibited.
 Profanity, obscenity, smut, vulgarity, or words or symbols which have acquired undesirable meanings are forbidden.
 Nudity in any form is prohibited, as is indecent or undue exposure.
 Suggestive and salacious illustration or suggestive posture is unacceptable.
 Females shall be drawn realistically without exaggeration of any physical qualities.
 Illicit sex relations are neither to be hinted at nor portrayed. Rape scenes, as well as sexual abnormalities, are unacceptable.
 Seduction and rape shall never be shown or suggested.
 Sex perversion or any inference to same is strictly forbidden.
 Nudity with meretricious purpose and salacious postures shall not be permitted in the advertising of any product; clothed figures shall never be presented in such a way as to be offensive or contrary to good taste or morals.

1960s–1970s

"Wolfman" and credits
Writer Marv Wolfman's name was briefly a point of contention between DC Comics and the CCA. In the supernatural-mystery anthology House of Secrets #83 (Jan. 1970), the book's host introduces the story "The Stuff that Dreams are Made of" as one told to him by "a wandering wolfman". (All-capitals comics lettering made no distinction between "wolfman" and "Wolfman".) The CCA rejected the story and flagged the "wolfman" reference as a violation. Fellow writer Gerry Conway explained to the CCA that the story's author was in fact named Wolfman, and asked whether it would still be in violation if that were clearly stated. The CCA agreed that it would not be, as long as Wolfman received a writer's credit on the first page of the story; this led to DC beginning to credit creators in its supernatural-mystery anthologies.

Updating the Code 
The Code was revised a number of times during 1971, initially on January 28, 1971, to allow for, among other things, the sometimes "sympathetic depiction of criminal behavior... [and] corruption among public officials" ("as long as it is portrayed as exceptional and the culprit is punished" as well as permitting some criminal activities to kill law-enforcement officers and the "suggestion but not portrayal of seduction." The clause "suggestive posture is unacceptable" was removed. Also newly allowed were "vampires, ghouls and werewolves... when handled in the classic tradition such as Frankenstein, Dracula, and other high calibre literary works written by Edgar Allan Poe, Saki, Conan Doyle and other respected authors whose works are read in schools around the world". Zombies, lacking the requisite "literary" background, remained taboo. To get around this restriction, Marvel in the mid-1970s called the apparently deceased, mind-controlled followers of various Haitian supervillains "zuvembies". This practice carried over to Marvel's superhero line: in The Avengers, when the reanimated superhero Wonder Man returns from the dead, he is referred to as a "zuvembie". DC comics published their own zombie story in Swamp Thing #16 (May 1975), where the deceased rise from their graves, while a soul-devouring demon appears in Swamp Thing #15 (April 1975).

Around this time, the United States Department of Health, Education and Welfare approached Marvel Comics editor-in-chief Stan Lee to do a story about drug abuse. Lee agreed and wrote a three-part Spider-Man story, portraying drug use as dangerous and unglamorous. While the Code did not specifically forbid depictions of drugs, a general clause prohibited "All elements or techniques not specifically mentioned herein, but which are contrary to the spirit and intent of the code, and are considered violations of good taste or decency". The CCA had approved at least one previous story involving drugs, the premiere of Deadman in Strange Adventures #205 (Oct. 1967), which clearly depicted the title character fighting opium smugglers. However, Code administrator Leonard Darvin "was ill" at the time of the Spider-Man story, and acting administrator John L. Goldwater (publisher of Archie Comics) refused to grant Code approval because of the depiction of narcotics being used, regardless of the context, whereas the Deadman story had depicted only a wholesale business transaction.

Confident that the original government request would give him credibility, and with the approval of his publisher Martin Goodman, Lee ran the story in The Amazing Spider-Man #96–98 (May–July 1971), without CCA approval. The storyline was well received, and the CCA's argument for denying approval was deemed counterproductive. "That was the only big issue that we had"  with the Code, Lee recalled in a 1998 interview:

Lee and Marvel drew criticism from DC head Carmine Infantino "for defying the code", stating that DC will not "do any drug stories unless the code is changed". As a result of publicity surrounding the Department of Health, Education and Welfare's sanctioning of the storyline, however, the CCA revised the Code to permit the depiction of "narcotics or drug addiction" if presented "as a vicious habit". DC itself then broached the topic in the Code-approved Green Lantern/Green Arrow #85 (Sept. 1971), with writer Denny O'Neil and artist Neal Adams beginning a story arc involving Green Arrow's teen sidekick Speedy as a heroin addict. A cover line read, "DC attacks youth's greatest problem... Drugs!"

1980s–present 
A late adopter of the code was Now Comics, which began displaying the Code seal on titles released in early 1989.

Abandonment 
By the 2000s, advertisers no longer made decisions to advertise based on the appearance of the stamp. Most new publishers to emerge during this time did not join the CCA, regardless of whether their content conformed to its standards.

In 2001, the CCA rejected an issue of the Marvel Comics series X-Force, requiring changes to be made. Instead, Marvel stopped submitting its comics to the CCA.

In 2010, Bongo Comics discontinued using the Code without any announcements regarding its abandonment.

The CMAA, at some point in the 2000s, was managed by the trade-organization management firm the Kellen Company, which ceased its involvement in 2009. In 2010, some publishers, including Archie, placed the seal on their comics without submitting them to the CMAA. Archie Comics President Mike Pellerito stated that the code did not affect his company the way that it did others as "we aren't about to start stuffing bodies into refrigerators".

On January 20, 2011, DC Comics announced that it would discontinue participation, adopting a rating system similar to Marvel's. The company noted that it submitted comics for approval through December 2010, but would not say to whom they were submitted. A day later, Archie Comics, the only other publisher still participating in the Code, announced it also was discontinuing it, rendering the Code defunct.

On September 29, 2011, the Comic Book Legal Defense Fund announced that it would acquire the  intellectual property rights to the Comics Code seal from the defunct CMAA.

The Comics Code seal can be seen at the beginning of the 2018 superhero film Spider-Man: Into the Spider-Verse as part of the production logos. Later in the film, when Miles is reading Spider-Man's origin (a slightly altered take of Amazing Fantasy #15), the CCA logo is replaced with a similar logo reading "Approved by the Cabin Fever Production Code," a reference to the Senate hearings and formation of the CCA.

In May 2021, Binge Books announced that it had used the seal on the one-shot comic Heroes Union, produced by Roger Stern, Ron Frenz, and Sal Buscema.

See also 

 Children's comics
 Censorship in the United States
 Children and Young Persons (Harmful Publications) Act 1955
 LGBT themes in comics
 Motion Picture Production Code
 Tokyo Metropolitan Ordinance Regarding the Healthy Development of Youths

References

Bibliography 
 Dean, M. (2001) Marvel drops Comics Code, changes book distributor. The Comics Journal #234, p. 19.
 Hajdu, David. The Ten-Cent Plague: The Great Comic-Book Scare and How it Changed America. New York: Farrar, Straus and Giroux, 2008.
 Nyberg, Amy Kiste. Seal of Approval: History of the Comics Code. Jackson: University Press of Mississippi, 1998.
 Original Comics Code
 1971 Revision
 1989 Revision

External links 

 Leopold, Todd. "The Pictures that Horrified America", May 8, 2008
 Vassallo, Michael J. "A Look at the Atlas Pre-Code Crime and Horror Work of Stan Lee". The Buyer's Guide #1258 (December 26, 1997), via Live ForEverett..
 FBI, "Comics Magazine Association of America, 1960"
 "Seduction of the Innocents and the Attack on Comic Books"
 Comics Code Authority – on Lambiek Comiclopedia

1954 establishments in the United States
2011 disestablishments in the United States
Organizations established in 1954
Censorship in the United States
Controversies in the United States
Comics-related organizations
Comics controversies
Comics censorship
History of American comics
Media content ratings systems
Organizations disestablished in 2011
1954 in comics
Moral panic